Tazan (also Romanized as Tāzān; also known as Tāzān-e ‘Olyā and Tārūn-e ‘Olyā) is a village in Keshvar Rural District, Papi District, Khorramabad County, Lorestan Province, Iran. At the 2006 census, its population was 72, in 17 families.

References 

Towns and villages in Khorramabad County